Robert Kayanja is the founder and senior pastor of the Miracle Centre Cathedral, a megachurch in Kampala. He is also the founder and CEO of a Christian television channel, Channel 44 Television (Miracle Ltd).

Ministry and theology  
Robert Kayanja started the Miracle Centre as a papyrus reed structure, together with a few other young ministers. Today it is among the region's largest church buildings, accommodating over 10,000 people. He is also overseer of the Miracle Bible College, the Never Again Children's project and the Kapeeka orphanage. He is the director of Miracle Television and a frequent speaker on Daystar Television Network. The church has also founded over 1,000 Miracle Centre churches across the country.

Kayanja encourages his congregation to achieve wealth and serve their personal goals.

He is the chairman of AfriAid.

Kyanja is the vision bearer of the 77 Days of Glory, commonly known as the 77DOGs.

Awards
Kayanja won the Worldsavers Man of the Year Award in 2014.

Kayanja also won the VIGA Merit Award. The VIGA Awards are Uganda's National Interdenominational gospel awards, through which the gospel Music industry recognizes and rewards its peers for their musical accomplishments.

Philanthropy
President Yoweri Museveni paid tribute to pastor Robert Kayanja and General Salim Saleh for spearheading food aid to South Sudan.

"I congratulate the congregation and General Saleh for having the noble idea of helping our brothers and sisters in South Sudan who are in need," he said. He observed that they have made the aid in line with the teachings in the Bible that require man to love his neighbor as he loves himself. He said that they were making the right move in standing by our brothers in South Sudan.

Senior Presidential advisor on military affairs, General Salim Saleh, along with Kampala businessmen under the umbrella organization Afri-Aid, have raised sh300m to buy food for people in war-ravaged South Sudan. Saleh explained that before the fundraising drive for the people of South Sudan, Kampala business woman Esther Mpumuza approached him and advised that there was need to pray for the people of South Sudan and also mobilize financial support for them.

As chairman of Afri-Aid, Kayanja said, "This is the time for Africans to bring whatever you have so that we can support our people who are living a bad life in South Sudan. As the chairman of Afri-aid I have to make sure Ugandans raise sh2b to buy food for the people in South Sudan."

Criticism and controversy
On 31 December 2005, Kayanja prophesied that one of the presidential election candidates would die. MPs expressed concern, but this did not happen before the election.

In 2006 he was criticised for amassing wealth and building a palace at Gaba, a suburb of Kampala on the shore of Lake Victoria.  Kayanja told critics to mind their own business, saying that the grand house was a marriage gift to his wife.

In 2009, a scandal erupted when Kayanja was accused of sexually abusing two teenage male church members. Other pastors had assisted the teenagers in filing their complaints, which were later withdrawn. Kayanja's supporters accused rivals of seeking to damage his reputation ahead of a visit by American preacher Benny Hinn to the Miracle Centre Cathedral. 
The police later cleared Kayanja of sodomy. 
They also cleared his accusers of charges of conspiracy to damage his reputation. However, in October 2012 Buganda Road Court fined six people, including pastor Martin Ssempa, 1 million shillings (about $390 US) each and ordered them to do 100 hours of community service, after convicting them of conspiring to destroy Pastor Robert Kayanja's name and profession.

Confession and apology
On 2 December 2016, Musasizi Robert, popularly known as Mukisa, who was the principal witness in 2009 accusing Kayanja of sexual abuse, went to Miracle Centre Cathedral in company of his mother. This was during the 77 days of Glory, a revival assembly of prayer and communion with the Holy Spirit. Musasizi Robert publicly confessed to having been used as a puppet by some pastors and legal practitioners to accuse Kayanja, something which was not true. He looked sorry and apologised to Kayanja and wife Jessica Kayanja.
By the end of the confession, Kayanja forgave and blessed this gentleman’s family and prophesied prosperity upon him.

Personal and family life
Kayanja resides in Kampala with his wife Jessica, son Robert Kayanja Jr. and twin daughters Kirstein and Kristiana. Kristiana survived brain cancer in 2004. Pastor Kayanja is the younger brother of the former Anglican Archbishop of York, John Sentamu, and of David Makumbi, a bishop in a Ugandan church.

References

External links
Kayanja's website

Living people
Year of birth missing (living people)
Converts to Christianity
Ugandan clergy
People from Wakiso District
Ugandan Pentecostal pastors